Bölücek is a village in the Beytüşşebap District of Şırnak Province in Turkey. The village is populated by Kurds of non-tribal affiliation and had a population of 381 in 2021.

The four hamlets of Ballı, Çakıcı, Değirmenlı and Güvendik are attached to Bölücek.

References 

Villages in Beytüşşebap District
Kurdish settlements in Şırnak Province